The 1989–90 South Midlands League season was 61st in the history of South Midlands League.

Premier Division

The Premier Division featured 17 clubs which competed in the division last season, along with 2 new clubs:
Welwyn Garden United, promoted from last season's Division One
Milton Keynes/Wolverton Town, relegated from Isthmian League Division Two North

League table

Division One

The Division One featured 11 clubs which competed in the division last season, along with 5 new clubs:
Wingate, joined from Herts County League Premier Division
Shenley & Loughton
Bedford United
Toddington Rovers
Risborough Rangers

League table

References

1989–90
8